Gong Jianhua (born June 1962) is a former Chinese politician who spent his entire career in his home-province Jiangxi. He surrendered himself to and is cooperating with the Central Commission for Discipline Inspection (CCDI) and National Supervisory Commission for investigation of "suspected violations of disciplines and laws" on 29 November 2021. Previously he served as vice chairman of the Standing Committee of Jiangxi Provincial People's Congress. Gong is the fourth vice-provincial level official in Jiangxi to be targeted by China's top anticorruption watchdog since the 19th National Congress of the Chinese Communist Party, behind Li Yihuang, Shi Wenqing and Xiao Yi.

Early life and education
Gong was born in Nanchang County, Jiangxi, in June 1962. After resuming the college entrance examination in 1979, he was admitted to Jiangxi University of Finance and Economics, majoring in economics.

Career
Gong worked in government after university in 1983, and joined the Chinese Communist Party (CCP) in October 1984. After working in the Rural Work Department of CCP Jiangxi Provincial Committee and the Jiangxi Provincial Agriculture and Rural Development Department for 17 years, he was elevated to vice mayor of Nanchang, capital of Jiangxi. In December 2002, he was appointed secretary of Nanchang Municipal Political and Legal Affairs Commission, concurrently serving as deputy party secretary of Nanchang and party secretary of Jiangling Motors since January 2004. In January 2006, he was named acting mayor of Yichun, replacing . He was installed as mayor the next month. In August 2011, he was promoted to become party secretary of Fuzhou, and served until October 2014, when he was transferred back to Nanchang as secretary-general of CCP Jiangxi Provincial Committee. His predecessor Zhao Zhiyong was probed on suspicion of "serious violations of laws and regulations" on June 3. He was appointed party secretary of Nanchang in March 2015 and was admitted to member of the standing committee of the CCP Jiangxi Provincial Committee, the province's top authority. In January 2017, he took office as vice chairman of the Standing Committee of Jiangxi Provincial People's Congress, and held that office until 29 November 2021, when he handed himself in to the Central Commission for Discipline Inspection (CCDI), the party's internal disciplinary body, and the National Supervisory Commission, the highest anti-corruption agency of China. His colleague Shi Wenqing, also vice chairman of the Standing Committee of Jiangxi Provincial People's Congress, had been placed under investigation in September 2020. His successor Xiao Yi was put under investigation in May 2021.

He was a delegate to the 11th National People's Congress.

References

1962 births
Living people
People from Nanchang
Jiangxi University of Finance and Economics alumni
Mayors of Yichun, Jiangxi
People's Republic of China politicians from Jiangxi
Chinese Communist Party politicians from Jiangxi
Delegates to the 11th National People's Congress